Bob Bryan and Mike Bryan were the defending champions but did not compete that year.

Mark Knowles and Daniel Nestor won in the final 4–6, 6–3, 6–4 against Mariano Hood and Sebastián Prieto.

Seeds
Champion seeds are indicated in bold text while text in italics indicates the round in which those seeds were eliminated. All eight seeded teams received byes to the second round.

Draw

Final

Top half

Bottom half

References
 2004 Open SEAT Godó Doubles Draw

Open Torneo Godo
2004 Torneo Godó